Tigran Edmondovich Keosayan (born January 4, 1966) is a Russian film director, actor and television presenter of Armenian origin. He is a winner of film festival prizes including TEFI,  Kinotavr  and  2001.

Described as a pro-Kremlin television presenter, the European Union and United Kingdom imposed sanctions on Keosayan as a result of the 2022 Russian invasion of Ukraine.

On 24 June 2022, Kazakhstan reported that Keosayan was put in the same list with terrorists who are denied entry. On 10 October, Armenian authorities declarated Keosayan and his wife Margarita Simonyan persona non grata as a “agents from different countries with Armenian surnames” who allow themselves a disrespectful attitude towards Armenia.

Biography

Keosayan is the son of Armenian-Russian film director and composer Edmond Keosayan and actress Laura Gevorkyan. He studied at the all-Union (now – all-Russian) state Institute of Cinematography (VGIK).

Keosayan is the director of Russian films including Katyka and Shiz (1992), Poor Sasha (1997), Lily of the Valley Silvery (2005), Hare Over the Abyss (2006), The Twelve Chairs musical (2003), a large number of clips for Mikhail Shufutinsky, Igor Sarukhanov, and Irina Allegrova. He is co-operated with Fyodor Bondarchuk, Alexander Zbruev and others.

Keosayan is an anchorman of the daily (from Monday to Thursday) analytical talk show With Tigran Keosayan on the Russian private TV channel REN-TV.

Personal life
Keosayan is married to Margarita Simonyan.

On 27 April 2022, the Ministry of Foreign Affairs of Kazakhstan announced its intention to introduce an absolute travel ban on entry into the country after his statements about the position of the Kazakh government in regards to the 2022 Russian invasion of Ukraine. In a video posted on his YouTube channel, regarding news that Kazakhstan would not hold a Victory Day parade on 9 May, Keosayan asked "Kazakhs, brothers. What is with the non-gratitude?" and said "Look at Ukraine carefully, think seriously".

On 24 June 2022, Kazakhstan reported that Keosayan was put in the same list with terrorists who are denied entry.

Sanctions
After the Russian invasion of Ukraine in 2022, Keosayan was one of the individuals sanctioned by the European Union. The reasons given for the sanctions were that Keosayan has spread anti-Ukrainian propaganda, and used his state-funded TV show to claim that the Ukrainian government was not lawful and repeatedly state that Crimea is part of Russia and that Donbass is not part of Ukraine. He has publicly accused Ukraine of escalating the conflict.

He has consistently used his show to portray Ukraine as a weak and corrupt country that is being kept alive solely thanks to Western aid. Keosayan took part in the "Russian Donbass Basin" forum organized by the authorities of the so-called Donetsk People's Republic in Donetsk with the aim of spreading the "Russian Donbass Basin" doctrine.

Keosayan was included in the list of Russians under personal sanctions by the United Kingdom in March.

Controversy

Blackface segment about Barack Obama 
On 30 November 2020, Keosayan's TV show "International Sawmill", for which Keosayan and his wife Margarita Simonyan are co-writers, aired a segment featuring Keosayan, and an actress in blackface posing as former United States President Barack Obama. In the segment,  Keosayan, referring to Obama's book A Promised Land, asks the actress: "Do you consider this book your achievement?", to which the actress in blackface replies: "Of course." 

Keosayan then asks: "Because none of your relatives have written books?", after which the actress answers: "Because none of my relatives that came before me could write." Keosayan then states "you should have a rap musician, not the president". In the segment, the actress wears a bandana and gold chains and behaves in a way regarded as stereotypical to rappers. The segment was widely deemed as being racist.

Investigation 
On March 10, 2020, an Anti-Corruption Foundation investigation revealed embezzlement of the state budget of Russia and various corruption schemes associated with the television program "The International Sawmill" (ru. "Международная пилорама" / "Mezhdunarodnaya pilorama"), broadcast on prime-time on the Russian federal channel NTV.

In several of the program’s episodes, Keosayan insults and slanders leaders of various countries such as France, the United States, and Turkey. Emmanuel Macron is frequently incorrectly described, using vulgarities, as a homosexual. And obeying the "personality cult of Putin," the president of Russia is exalted.

Active censorship of this incident was undertaken in the Russian-language Wikipedia. Detailed description on "OneLittleMouse" talk page (on russian)

Filmography

As a film director 
   Katyka and Shiz (1992)
 Cases Funny, Family Matters (1996, TV Series)
  Poor Sasha (1997)
 The Death Directory (1999, TV series)
 Silver Lily of the Valley (2000)
  The President and His Granddaughter (2000)
 Men's Work (2001, also TV series: 2005)
 Hare Over the Abyss (2006) 
 Rabbit Over the Void (2006)
Mirage (2008)
 Yalta-45 (2011, mini-series)
 Three Comrades (2012, mini-series)
 Sea. Mountains. Exclay (2014, TV series)
 Actress (2017, TV series)
 The Crimean Bridge. Made with Love! (2018)

As an actor 
 Joker (1991)
 Silver Lily of the Valley (2000)
 The Heat (2006)

As a writer 
 Cases funny, family matters (1996, TV Series)
 Silver Lily of the Valley (TV series, 2005).

References

External links

 

Living people
1966 births
Russian propagandists
Russian people of Armenian descent
Russian film directors
Gerasimov Institute of Cinematography alumni
Academicians of the Russian Academy of Cinema Arts and Sciences "Nika"
REN TV
Soviet male actors
Male actors from Moscow
Mass media people from Moscow
Russian television presenters
Russian screenwriters
Russian individuals subject to European Union sanctions
Russian individuals subject to United Kingdom sanctions
Anti-Ukrainian sentiment in Russia